Paul Schulze (born June 12, 1962) is an American actor.  He is known for appearing in The Sopranos, Nurse Jackie,  24 (2002–2004), and The Punisher (2017), and his films roles in Panic Room (2002), and Rambo (2008).

Career
He is best known for portraying Ryan Chappelle on the Fox series 24 from 2001 to 2004 and Father Phil Intintola on the HBO series The Sopranos from 1999 to 2006.

Schulze was featured on Fox's legal drama, Justice and has guest-starred on Law & Order, Rizzoli & Isles, JAG, CSI: Crime Scene Investigation, The West Wing, NCIS, Oz, Frasier, NYPD Blue, Boston Legal, Cold Case, Numb3rs, Mad Men, Criminal Minds, The Closer, Terminator: The Sarah Connor Chronicles, Suits, Z Nation, and Journeyman.
He played William Rawlins in the Netflix series The Punisher in 2017.

Film appearances include New Jersey Drive (1995), Clockers (1995), Don't Say a Word (2001), and the David Fincher films Panic Room (2002) and Zodiac (2007). He appeared as Michael Burnett in Rambo, the 2008 fourth installment of the Rambo film saga. He co-starred as Eddie Walzer in the Showtime dark comedy series Nurse Jackie, which premiered in June 2009.

Filmography

Film

Television

References

External links
 
 Misc. video interviews at Movieweb.com
 Short film "Blindsight"
 Short film "Last Writes"
 Short film "Copland"

1962 births
Living people
American male film actors
American male television actors
Place of birth missing (living people)
21st-century American male actors
20th-century American male actors